Telladevarapalli is a village in Visannapeta mandal, Krishna district, Andhra Pradesh, India.

References

Villages in Krishna district